Jacoba ("Coby") Maria Jozina van Baalen-Dorresteijn (born 6 April 1957 in Werkhoven, Utrecht) is an equestrian from the Netherlands, who won the silver medal in the Team Dressage event at the 2000 Summer Olympics in Sydney, Australia. She did so alongside Anky van Grunsven, Ellen Bontje, and Arjen Teeuwissen. In the Individual Competition Van Baalen finished in fifth position. Her daughter Marlies van Baalen is also an Olympic equestrian. Van Baalen competed in the Olympics with a KWPN stallion called Ferro, also known as Olympic Ferro.

External links
 Dutch Olympic Committee
 
 
 

1957 births
Living people
Dutch dressage riders
Dutch female equestrians
Equestrians at the 2000 Summer Olympics
Olympic equestrians of the Netherlands
Olympic medalists in equestrian
Olympic silver medalists for the Netherlands
People from Bunnik
Medalists at the 2000 Summer Olympics
Sportspeople from Utrecht (province)